Tom Weston is a New Zealand Queen's Counsel and poet. 

Tom Weston may also refer to:

Tom Weston, a character in the British TV series The Guardians
Tom Weston, a character in the 1916 American silent film The Love Hermit

See also
Thomas Weston (disambiguation)